Kakak is a 2015 Indonesian horror film, based on true story from the Director – Ivander Tedjasukmana. The film was directed by Ivander Tedjasukmana, written by Ivander Tedjasukmana & Kim Kematt, and stars Laudya Cynthia Bella, Surya Saputra, and Yafi Tessa Zahara. This film was released on November 5, 2015.

Plot
Adi (Surya Saputra) and Kirana (Laudya Cynthia Bella) have been married for a long time but are still childless. Kirana's body is weak due to her asthma and has experienced three miscarriages, causing stress and depression. They still live with Adi's mother, Aida (Ivanka Suwandi), who doesn't approve of Kirana mostly because she's been unable to bear a child. Trying to 
relieve his wife's stress, Adi decides that a move to a neighborhood 
outside of town would be the best for them both.
Kirana starts to feel that there is something strange with their 
new home, that something else is present with them. At first she 
is afraid, but over time she becomes used to the presence, a girl 
ghost who she calls “SISTER”. Adi becomes worried about Kirana's 
closeness with “SISTER”, but Kirana believes that “SISTER” is a kind and 
gentle soul. Adi decides to put aside his worries as he sees Kirana 
become more and more happy. 
Their happiness and closeness changes when Kirana becomes 
pregnant. “SISTER” begins to terrorize them because of jealousy. 
Aida also decides to stay with them in order to support Kirana. 
“SISTER” hurts Aida and tries to hurt Kirana and her baby. Adi 
struggles to protect his wife and unborn child from SISTER's wrath.

Production 
The film was produced in December 2014 and took eight days of filming. The film is 85 minutes long. The director, Ivander Tedjasukmana, said that the film was based on the true story of a grandfather and his grandchild. He said that the story is developed with elements of drama to make the audience interested in the characters. According to the screenwriter, Kim Kematt, "This is a drama film with horror spices. The audience will see something new. That, horror films can not only show fear and shock. But there are also very strong stories. Furthermore, the point is, we all live side by side with other dimensions." The film sparked controversy because Laudya Cynthia Bella is not wearing a hijab (veil) in the film even though Bella has worn a hijab since January 2015. She clarified on October 27, 2015, that this film was shot before Bella made her decision to wear a hijab.

Release 
The film's release was delayed from March 2015 to November 2015, because of 21 Cineplex's tight schedule and the need to cut some scenes.

Reception 
According to Puput Puji Lestari from Fimela, this film is not an ordinary horror and it provides drama and comedy between the tension. She praised Bella's and Saputra's acting but thought that the sound arrangement is "loose".

References

External links 
 
  @Official Trailer KAKAK (Sister)

Indonesian horror films
2015 horror films